Sevenhampton is a village and civil parish in Cotswold District, Gloucestershire. The village population taken at the 2011 census was 333.

The name of the village is believed to be derived from an older name, Sennington, which was still in use into the early modern period.

The Church of St Andrew was built in the 12th century. It is a grade I listed building.

References

External links

Villages in Gloucestershire
Civil parishes in Gloucestershire